William Thomas Briggs (April 6, 1925 – April 19, 2000) was a Canadian football player who played for the Edmonton Eskimos and Toronto Argonauts. He won the Grey Cup with the Argos in 1947 (35th) before moving to Edmonton, where he had three more Grey Cup wins in 1954 (42nd), 1955 (43rd), and 1956 (44th).

Briggs was born in Toronto, Ontario, Canada and is often confused with another football player, William John Brigg, who played for the University of Iowa.

After retiring from football, Bill pursued several careers, among them a salesman for McLaren Electronics, a master electrician and a minister with the United Church. He held the position of assistant minister at St. Andrews Wesley Church in Vancouver, British Columbia for several years. He died at a hospice in Penticton, British Columbia in 2000.

Briggs was inducted into the Alberta Sports Hall of Fame and Museum in 2007, as a member of the 1954-56 Edmonton Eskimos teams.

References

External links
Edmonton Eskimos (1954-55-56)

1925 births
2000 deaths
Canadian football running backs
Edmonton Elks players
Iowa Hawkeyes football players
Toronto Argonauts players
Players of Canadian football from Ontario
Canadian football people from Toronto